Eaton is a station stop on the RTA light rail Green Line in Shaker Heights, Ohio, located at the intersection of Eaton Road, Torrington Road and Shaker Boulevard (Ohio State Route 87).

History
The station opened on May 20, 1915, when rail service on what is now Shaker Boulevard was extended from its previous terminus Fontenay Road two blocks west of here for 0.6 miles (1 km) east to Courtland Boulevard. The rail line was built by Cleveland Interurban Railroad and initially operated by the Cleveland Railway.

In 1980 and 1981, the Green and Blue Lines were completely renovated with new track, ballast, poles and wiring, and new stations were built along the line. The renovated line along Shaker Boulevard opened on October 11, 1980.

Station layout
The station comprises two side platforms, the westbound platform east of the intersection, and the eastbound platform west of the intersection, with a small shelter on the westbound platform.

References

External links

Green Line (RTA Rapid Transit)
Railway stations in the United States opened in 1915
1915 establishments in Ohio